Y9 may refer to:
 Shaanxi Y-9, a Chinese transport aircraft
 Lynx Air, IATA code
 LNER Class Y9, a class of British steam locomotives